The Western Museum of Mining & Industry is a museum at 225 North Gate Boulevard in Colorado Springs, Colorado, dedicated to the mining history and industrial technology of the western United States. The museum was founded in 1970, and has been accredited by the American Alliance of Museums since 1979. It is open to the public Mondays through Saturdays.

The museum building houses antique mining equipment and steam engines. Some of the pneumatic machines are connected to compressed air so that they can be viewed in actual operation. The museum also includes a recreation of an old assay office and scale models of mines and mills.

Outdoor exhibits include live burros, a steam shovel, and an operating stamp mill for gold ore.

The museum maintains a research library on mining topics, available by appointment.

Other activities at the museum include lectures, rotating exhibits, and a twice-weekly farmers’ market.

Gallery

References

External links
Western Museum of Mining & Industry website
Western Museum of Mining and Industry - Facebook page
Western Museum of Mining & Industry, New York Times review.
Summer Kids Guide - Western Museum of Mining and Industry Summer Camps

Industry museums in Colorado
Mining museums in Colorado
Museums in Colorado Springs, Colorado
Institutions accredited by the American Alliance of Museums